2021–21 season of Ghanaian club Karela United FC

Pre-season and friendlies 
The season was delayed as a result of COVID-19 pandemic.

Squad

Roaster beginning of season

League 

 2020–21 Ghana Premier League

Matches

Squad statistics

Goalscorers 
Includes all competitive matches. The list is sorted alphabetically by surname when total goals are equal.

Clean sheets 
The list is sorted by shirt number when total clean sheets are equal. Numbers in parentheses represent games where both goalkeepers participated and both kept a clean sheet; the number in parentheses is awarded to the goalkeeper who was substituted on, whilst a full clean sheet is awarded to the goalkeeper who was on the field at the start of play.

Awards

Ghana Premier League Player of the Month

Ghana Premier League Manager of the Month

Managers 

 Evans Adotey

References 

Karela United FC
2020–21 Ghana Premier League by team